Hyptis capitata, also known as false ironwort or knobweed, is a species of erect annual shrubs, of the plant family Lamiaceae. It is native to Florida, Mexico, Central America, the West Indies, and South America but naturalized in Australia, Southeast Asia, and some tropical islands. The plants grow up to a height of 1.5 meters. Crushed leaves are applied to cuts. It is considered a weed in many places.

References

External links

 From Weeds of Australia 
 About pollination

capitata
Flora of Mexico
Flora of Central America
Flora of South America
Flora of the Caribbean
Plants described in 1787
Taxa named by Nikolaus Joseph von Jacquin
Flora without expected TNC conservation status